The Philippines participated in the 23rd Southeast Asian Games which they were hosting the biennial meet for the third time. Athletes from the country earned 113 gold medals which placed the Philippines in the medal tally as the overall champions, 26 gold medals ahead of Thailand. The tally went down to 112 a few months later when a gold medalist from Taekwondo was disqualified and stripped of her prize.

892 athletes competed for the Philippines at the games and were joined by 308 officials.

The chief of mission to the games was Jose Miguel Arroyo. At the opening ceremony, the Philippine delegate was accompanied by Miss International 2005, Precious Lara Quigaman, then WBC Lightweight Champion, Manny Pacquiao and local celebrity, Angel Locsin.

Sports and athlete development

Most of the athletes were sent to China for a five-month training process. Innovations in terms of the acquisition of new facilities and proper budget allocation were the main concerns of the Philippine Sports Commission in cooperation with the Philippine Olympic Committee (POC). 

The POC awarded all medalists cash incentives.

Medalists

Gold

Silver

Bronze

Multiple

Medal summary

By sports

References

External links
RPSports.com – a detailed report on the medal win of Team Philippines

Southeast Asian Games
Nations at the 2005 Southeast Asian Games
2005